The Poona College of Arts, Science and Commerce is a Muslim minority academic institution in Pune, Maharashtra, India. It was established in the year 1970 by the Anjuman Khairul Islam (A.K.I) trust, Mumbai. It consists of a Junior College (11th and 12th standard) which is under the jurisdiction of the Maharashtra State Board of Secondary and Higher Secondary Education (MSBSHSE), and a Senior College, which is affiliated to the University of Pune.

Many changes in the appearance of the college were made in early 2004, enabling it to get an 'A' grade from the National Assessment and Accreditation Council (NAAC). 
Post-graduation degrees are offered for English, Economics, Urdu, Commerce, Computer Science, Electronics and Organic Chemistry. , Shaikh Aftab Anwar is Principal of Poona College.

External links

Colleges affiliated to Savitribai Phule Pune University
Education in Pune
Universities and colleges in Pune